The Foundation, The Machine, The Ascension is the second studio album by American post rock band Constants.  It was released in 2009 in CD and 3LP format.

Track listing
"Genetics Like Chess Pieces" - 5:56
"Damien" - 3:43
"Those Who Came Before Pt. I" - 6:19
"Those Who Came Before Pt. II" - 4:02
"The Nameless" - 6:16
"The Timeless" - 4:29
"Identity of Indiscernibles" - 4:30
"Eternal Reoccurrence" - 3:21
"Abraxas Pt. I" - 5:56
"Abraxas Pt. II" - 4:54
"Ascension" - 2:23
"...Passage" - 6:12

Personnel
 Will Benoit - guitar, vocals, programming
 Rob Motes - drums
 Orion Wainer - bass

External links
 The Band's MySpace Page
 The Mylene Sheath

References

2009 albums
Constants (band) albums